Ruwer or Ruwerthal is a wine-growing district (Bereich) at the Ruwer (river) near Trier, Germany. It is a district of the Mosel region, which used to be called Mosel-Saar-Ruwer.

The Romans produced wine in the Ruwer region since the 2nd century.

Villages and vineyards
 Ruwer/Eitelsbach: Karthäuserhofberg, Sonnenberg, Marienholz, Maximiner, Domherrenberg.
 Mertesdorf: Maximin Grünhaus: Bruderberg, Abtsberg, Herrenberg; Lorenzhöfer Mäuerchen, Lorenzhöfer Felslay, Johannisberg, Herrenberg;
 Kasel: Herrenberg, Dominikanerberg, Kehrnagel, Hitzlay, Nieschen, Paulinsberg, Timpert.
 Waldrach: Heiligenhäuschen, Hubertusberg, Sonnenberg, Jungfernberg, Krone, Laurentiusberg, Ehrenberg, Doktorberg, Meisenberg, Jesuitengarten, Kurfürstenberg.
 Morscheid: Heiligenhäuschen, Dominikanerberg.
 Riveris: Kuhnchen, Heiligenhäuschen.
 Sommerau: Schlossberg
 Korlingen: Leikaul

External links
 Ruwer-Riesling e.V.
 Ruwerwein.de

Ruwer